Riverside Cemetery is a historic cemetery in Yarmouth, Maine, United States. Several prominent early business owners, sea captains and other townspeople are buried in the cemetery, including Leon Gorman, former president of L.L.Bean, which was founded by his grandfather, Leon Leonwood Bean.

Although it was founded in 1869, Riverside Cemetery has graves dating to the 1700s. The cemetery's oldest burials are on the northern side; the more recent ones are on the southern side. A long driveway, which leads to another cemetery, separates the two.

Of all burials at the cemetery between 2018 and 2020, 65% were burials of cremated remains.

Holy Cross, a Catholic cemetery, is attached to Riverside to the east. It was established by Father Joseph Quinn, pastor of Sacred Heart Catholic Church, in the early 20th century.

Notable burials
Listed chronologically:
Dr. Eleazer Burbank (1793–1867), physician and state legislator
Edward J. Stubbs (1833–1887), shipwright
Henry Hutchins (1819–1889), shipwright
Dr. Augustus Burbank (1823–1895), physician
Harlan Prince (1837–1899), sea captain
Joseph York Hodsdon (1836–1901), Maine state senator
Alfred T. Small (1826–1906), sea captain
Lorenzo L. Shaw (1828–1907), businessman 
James M. Bates (1827–1911), physician
Frank L. Oakes (1859–1912), sea captain
Charles Chandler Oakes (1856–1934), sea captain and Frank's older brother
Lyman Fessenden Walker (1836–1920), shipbuilder
Herbert A. Merrill (1855–1926), physician
William Hutchinson Rowe (1882–1955), town historian and author
Frank Knight (1908–2012), tree warden of "Herbie"
Leon Gorman (1934–2015), former president of L.L.Bean
Carl Henry Winslow (1931–2020), former fire chief of Yarmouth

References

External links

Cemetery Records, July 2020 – yarmouthmehistory.org
Riverside Cemetery – Find a Grave

1869 establishments in Maine
Cemeteries in Yarmouth, Maine